Casearia atlantica is a species of flowering plant in the family Salicaceae. It is endemic to Panama.  It is threatened by habitat loss.

References

Flora of Panama
atlantica
Endangered plants
Taxonomy articles created by Polbot